Imrul Kayes (born 2 February 1987) is a Bangladeshi international cricketer who played for Khulna Division as a left-hand batsman and occasional wicket-keeper.

International career
He made his first-class debut in 2006, playing 15 first-class matches and 16 One Day matches before being called up for the third One Day International between Bangladesh and New Zealand in Chittagong. Batting at number three, he made just 12 runs as Bangladesh lost by 79 runs.

He made his Test debut in November 2008, playing the first match of a series in South Africa. He opened the batting on his debut, but made just 10 and 4 in his two innings, being dismissed twice on the second afternoon of the match.

He later found form in 2010 scoring 867 runs, becoming the 5th highest runs scorer of the year in ODIs at an average of 32.11. He scored his maiden ODI century against New Zealand. When the Bangladesh Cricket Board (BCB) announced its list of central contracts in November 2010, Kayes was given a grade B contract.

In 2017, in the second test against New Zealand after Mushfiqur Rahim got head injury in the first test, Kayes served as a substitute wicket-keeper and he had 5 dismissals in an innings, which is also the most for any substitute wicketkeeper in an innings of a test and was also the first substitute wicket-keeper to take 5 test catches.

On October 21, 2018, Kayes scored a career best 144(140) against Zimbabwe in the first ODI, tying it with second most by a Bangladeshi batsman in an ODI along with Mushfiqur Rahim. After the concluding third ODI, Kayes had scored 349 runs in the series with scores of 144, 90, and 115, respectively, which would help Bangladesh whitewash Zimbabwe in the series. He accomplished the feat of making the second most runs in a bilateral three match ODI series, just 11 runs shy from current record holder Babar Azam.

In May 2021, he was named in Bangladesh's ODI preliminary squad for their home series against Sri Lanka, since he last played an ODI against the Windies in 2018.

2011 World Cup
Bangladesh failed to progress beyond the group stage of the 2011 World Cup; Kayes was Bangladesh's leading run-scorer in the tournament with 188 runs at an average of 37.60. During the tournament, he produced two Man-of-the-Match performances, striking fifties against England and the Netherlands to help Bangladesh to victory on each occasion, though he felt bowler Shafiul Islam deserved the first award instead. With Manjural Islam Rana he became just the second Bangladesh player to win consecutive Man-of-the-Match awards in ODIs.

Domestic career
The BCB founded the six-team Bangladesh Premier League in 2012, a twenty20 tournament to be held in February that year. An auction was held for teams to buy players, and Kayes was bought by the Sylhet Royals for $50,000. He scored 102 runs from 7 innings in the competition. In April the BCB upgraded Kayes' central contract from grade B to grade A.

In October 2018, he was named in the squad for the Comilla Victorians team, following the draft for the 2018–19 Bangladesh Premier League. In November 2019, he was selected to play for the Chattogram Challengers in the 2019–20 Bangladesh Premier League.

Notes

External links

1987 births
Living people
Bangladesh Test cricketers
Bangladesh One Day International cricketers
Bangladesh Twenty20 International cricketers
Bangladeshi cricketers
Khulna Division cricketers
Cricketers at the 2011 Cricket World Cup
Rangpur Riders cricketers
Sylhet Strikers cricketers
Cricketers at the 2015 Cricket World Cup
Asian Games medalists in cricket
Cricketers at the 2014 Asian Games
Asian Games bronze medalists for Bangladesh
Medalists at the 2014 Asian Games
Comilla Victorians cricketers
Abahani Limited cricketers
Gazi Tank cricketers
Brothers Union cricketers
Victoria Sporting Club cricketers
Bangladesh South Zone cricketers
Wicket-keepers
People from Meherpur District